Kambo  may refer to:
 Kambo, a village in Moss municipality, Norway
 The Kambo (Kamboj, Kamboh), an ethnic group inhabiting the Punjab region of India and Pakistan
 Kambo, the poisonous secretions of kambô (Phyllomedusa bicolor), a species of hylid frog native to Amazonia